Diane Joyce Drufenbrock  (7 October 1929 – 4 November 2013), also known as Sister Madeleine Sophie, was an American religious sister as a member of the Catholic School Sisters of St. Francis. She was a Christian socialist who was the vice-presidential candidate for the Socialist Party USA in the 1980 United States presidential election.

Drufenbrock was born in Evansville, Indiana. In 1948, after graduating Reitz Memorial High School, she moved to Milwaukee, Wisconsin, to enter the Franciscan Sisters. A mathematics graduate of Alverno College in 1953 and of Marquette University, she taught mathematics at Alverno College, at the University of Wisconsin–Parkside, and elsewhere around Milwaukee, including at the then-new St. Joseph High School (Kenosha) when it opened in September 1957.

Drufenbrock gained a doctorate in mathematics from the University of Illinois at Urbana in 1963. After teaching for 13 years at Alverno College, she taught at Saint Mary-of-the-Woods College in her native Indiana for 18 years.

Her interest in social issues led her to join the Socialist Party USA in 1976. She ran as their vice-presidential candidate in the 1980 United States presidential election, and served as that party's National Treasurer. That campaign resulted in the Party's recognition by the Federal Elections Commission as a national political party.

References

1929 births
2013 deaths
People from Evansville, Indiana
Politicians from Milwaukee
Alverno College alumni
20th-century American Roman Catholic nuns
Third Order Regular Franciscans
Marquette University alumni
Schoolteachers from Wisconsin
American women educators
University of Illinois Urbana-Champaign alumni
Nonviolence advocates
American Christian socialists
Socialist Party USA vice presidential nominees
1980 United States vice-presidential candidates
20th-century American politicians
University of Wisconsin–Parkside faculty
Female candidates for Vice President of the United States
Saint Mary-of-the-Woods College faculty
Socialist Party USA politicians from Wisconsin
Catholic socialists
Catholics from Wisconsin
Catholics from Indiana
Female Christian socialists
21st-century American Roman Catholic nuns